Western Belle may refer to:

 , a British commercial passenger ship built in 1935, since 2010 in service on Ullswater
 , a United States Navy cargo ship in commission from 1918 to 1919

Ship names